Dame Margaret Clark  (born 28 January 1941) is a New Zealand political science academic. She is currently an emeritus professor of politics at Victoria University of Wellington.

Early life, family, and education
Born in Wellington on 28 January 1941, Clark was educated at Wellington East Girls' College. She went on to study at Wellington Teachers' Training College and Victoria University College, completing a Bachelor of Arts in politics at the latter institution in 1960. After winning a Rotary Foundation Fellowship, she undertook further study at the University of Malaya in Kuala Lumpur from 1962 to 1963, graduating Master of Arts in 1964, and later doctoral studies at Columbia University in New York City from 1969 to 1972, gaining a PhD.

In 1980, Clark married Bernie Galvin, who served as Secretary to the Treasury from 1980 to 1986. Galvin died in 2010.

Career
After completing her MA, Clark lectured at the University of Melbourne for two years, and then at the University of Malaya for three years. She taught at the City University of New York from 1972 to 1975 following the completion of her PhD. Clark then returned to New Zealand, and was appointed as a senior lecturer in politics at Victoria University of Wellington. She was promoted to professor in 1978, and served as the dean of commerce and administration between 1980 and 1982.

From 1980 to 1985, Clark served as a human rights commissioner. She was conferred with the title of emeritus professor by Victoria University in 2010.

Honours
In the 1993 New Year Honours, Clark was appointed a Companion of the Order of St Michael and St George, for services to education. She was appointed a Distinguished Companion of the New Zealand Order of Merit, also for services to education, in the 2007 New Year Honours. Following the restoration of titular honours by the New Zealand government in 2009, she accepted redesignation as a Dame Companion of the New Zealand Order of Merit.

In 2012, the Margaret Clark Prize for Victoria University of Wellington honours politics students was established in her name.

Selected publications
 Clark, M, Other Worlds In Clark, M (ed), Beyond Expectations: fourteen New Zealand women write about their lives (Allen & Unwin, 1986).
Clark, M (ed), Keith Holyoake: Towards a Political Biography (Wellington: Dunmore Press, 1997).
 Clark, M (ed), Peter Fraser: Master Politician (Wellington: Dunmore Press, 1998.)
 Clark, M (ed), Three Labour Leaders: Nordmeyer, Kirk and Rowling (Wellington: Dunmore Press, 2001).
 Clark, M (ed), Holyoake's Lieutenants (Wellington: Dunmore Press, 2003).
 Clark, M (ed), Muldoon Revisited (Wellington: Dunmore Press, 2004).
 Clark, M (ed), Lange and the Fourth Labour Government (Wellington: Dunmore Press, 2006).
 Clark, M (ed), The Bolger Years: 1990–2007 (Wellington: Dunmore Press, 2008)

References

1941 births
Living people
People from Wellington City
People educated at Wellington East Girls' College
Victoria University of Wellington alumni
University of Malaya alumni
Academic staff of the University of Malaya
Academic staff of the University of Melbourne
Columbia University alumni
City University of New York faculty
Academic staff of the Victoria University of Wellington
Political science educators
New Zealand women academics
New Zealand editors
New Zealand women editors
New Zealand women writers
New Zealand Companions of the Order of St Michael and St George
Dames Companion of the New Zealand Order of Merit
New Zealand justices of the peace